Daggers is the plural of dagger.

It may also refer to:
Daggers (All Hail the Silence album), a 2019 album by All Hail the Silence
Daggers (The Defiled album), a 2013 album by The Defiled
"Daggers" (seaQuest DSV), the first episode of seaQuest DSV's second season